Everyday is the third studio album by the Athens, GA based band Widespread Panic. It was first released by Capricorn Records and Warner Bros. Records on March 3, 1993. It would later be re-released in 2001 by Zomba Music Group. On July 3, 2014 the band announced that Everyday would be reissued on Vinyl in August, 2014. The reissue will be distributed via ThinkIndie distribution and sold only at participating independent record stores.

Beginning on November 5, 1992, The band recorded the album at Muscle Shoals Sound Studio in Sheffield, AL. They were in the studio for roughly 5 weeks.

The album reached a peak position of #184 on the Billboard 200 chart and #10 on the Heatseekers chart.

The album was the group's first to feature bandmate, John Hermann.

Track listing
All tracks written by Widespread Panic, except where noted.

"Pleas" – 5:07
"Hatfield" – 6:50
"Wondering" – 3:56
"Papa's Home" – 6:42
"Diner" – 7:25
"Better Off" (T Lavitz, Widespread Panic) – 5:05
"Pickin' Up the Pieces" – 4:26
"Henry Parsons Died" (comp. Eric Carter, Daniel Hutchens) – 4:36
"Pilgrims" – 6:30
"Postcard" (comp. Thomas Guenther & Widespread Panic) – 4:27
"Dream Song" – 4:50

Personnel
Widespread Panic
 John Bell – vocals, guitar
 John Hermann – keyboards, chicken
 Michael Houser – guitar, vocals
 Todd Nance – drums
 Domingo S. Ortiz – percussion
 Dave Schools – bass, vocals

Additional musicians
 Hampton Dempster – accompanying vocal on "Pleas"
 Matt Mundy – mandolin on "Pickin' up the Pieces"
 Daniel Hutchens – accompanying vocal on "Henry Parsons Died"

Production
 Johnny Sandlin – producer, engineer, mixing
 Jim Bickerstaff – engineer, mixing 
 Alan Schulman – engineer
 Johnny Walls – assistant engineer
 Kent Bruce – assistant engineer, mixing assistant
 Benny Quinn – mastering
 Deborah Norcross – artwork
 Alastair Thain – photography
 Angelina Jolie – album cover and CD model

See also

Muscle Shoals, Alabama
Muscle Shoals Sound Studios

References

External links
Widespread Panic website
Everyday Companion
PanicStream
[ All Music entry]

1993 albums
Capricorn Records albums
Widespread Panic albums
Albums produced by John Keane (record producer)
Zomba Group of Companies albums